Nidularium scheremetiewii is a species of bromeliad in the genus Nidularium.

This species is endemic to the Atlantic Forest ecoregion only within Rio de Janeiro state, in southeastern Brazil.

References

scheremetiewii
Endemic flora of Brazil
Flora of the Atlantic Forest
Flora of Rio de Janeiro (state)